This is a list of films produced in the Netherlands during the 1990s. The films are produced in the Dutch language.

1990

1991

1992

1993

1994

1995

1996

1997

1998

1999

1990s
Films
Dutch